Sture Bengt Lorentz Baatz (26 August 1929 – 14 February 2004) was a Swedish rower. He competed in the eights at the 1952 and 1960 Summer Olympics, but failed to reach the finals.

References

1929 births
2004 deaths
Swedish male rowers
Olympic rowers of Sweden
Rowers at the 1952 Summer Olympics
Rowers at the 1960 Summer Olympics
20th-century Swedish people